Concerto Teatro Uomo is a live album by Italian Jazz fusion band Area released in 1996 and recorded in 1977 in Milan, while the band was supporting their fifth album Maledetti (Maudits). The album was criticized for its sound quality (it was not professionally recorded, unlike their 1975 live album Are(A)zione) and for some packaging errors (the CD split between "Evaporazione" and "Arbeit Macht Frei" is wrong, there is an uncredited performance of "Diforisma Urbano" on "Il Massacro Di Brandeburgo Numero Tre in Sol Maggiore", "Improvvisazione" is "Are(a)zione" and the cover credits include Paul Lytton and Steve Lacy but they are absent in the recording ), but was also praised for its musical content (including extended improvisations) and for Demetrio Stratos' useful information about the tracks during banter between songs. In 2002, this album was repackaged with another posthumous live album Parigi-Lisbona in the boxset Live Concerts Box.

Track listing

CD 1 

 "Evaporazione" – 4:54
 "Arbeit Macht Frei" – 4:43
 "Luglio, Agosto, Settembre (Nero)" – 7:09
 "L'Abbattimento dello Zeppelin" – 10:26
 "ZYG (Crescita Zero)" – 6:24
 "Cometa Rossa" – 9:38
 "Lobotomia" – 3:50
 "Il Massacro Di Brandeburgo Numero Tre in Sol Maggiore" – 7:14 (from 1:05 on, the track is "Diforisma Urbano")
 "L'Elefante Bianco" – 4:50
 "Gerontocrazia" – 6:54

CD 2 

 "La Mela di Odessa" – 17:57
 "Gioia e Rivoluzione" – 10:50
 "Scum" – 7:34
 "Giro, Giro, Tondo" – 8:03
 "L'internazionale" – 5:01
 "Boom Boom" (John Lee Hooker) – 6:49
 "Improvvisazione" – 13:50 (the track is "Are(A)zione")

Personnel 
 Giulio Capiozzo - drums, percussion
 Patrizio Fariselli - electric piano, piano, clarinet, synthesizer
 Demetrio Stratos - vocals, organ, clavicembalo, steel drums, percussion
 Ares Tavolazzi - bass, trombone
 Giampaolo Tofani - guitar, synthesizer, flute

References 

Area (band) albums
1996 live albums